The 2000 South Lakeland District Council election took place on 4 May 2000 to elect members of South Lakeland District Council in Cumbria, England. One-third of the council was up for election, and stayed under no overall control.

After the election, the composition of the council was as follows:
Liberal Democrat 23
Conservative 15
Labour 9
Independent 5

Election result

Ward results

References

2000
2000 English local elections
2000s in Cumbria